Hum Tum Pe Marte Hain is a 1999 Indian Hindi-language romantic comedy film directed by Nabh Kumar 'Raju'. The music for the movie was composed by Uttam Singh, with lyrics by Anand Bakshi.  The film was produced by Cheetah Yajnees Shetty.

Plot 
The story of the film revolves around two neighboring families. One family is headed by Sethji and the other by Devyani. Rahul is Sethji's son. He has just returned to his native town after completing his studies. Radhika, is Devyani's sister-in-law, recently arrived from the village. Radhika and Rahul, predictably, fall in love. Devyani is impressed with her business associate, Dhananjay. She is also aware of Rahul and Radhika's clandestine meetings, so she offers Radhika's hand in marriage to Dhananjay, who delightedly accepts. Rahul has to prove his love to Dhananjay and Devyani. The movie was shot in Manipal Udupi, Karnataka.

Cast 
Govinda as Rahul Kumar
Urmila Matondkar as Radhika
Dimple Kapadia as Devyani
Paresh Rawal as Shiv Kumar
Johnny Lever as Sattu
Gulshan Grover as Udhed Singh
Nirmal Pandey as Dhananjay
Himani Shivpuri as Uma 
Sheetal Bedi as an item number "Hum banjaare"

Soundtrack

References

External links 

1990s Hindi-language films
1999 films
Films scored by Uttam Singh